Herpetogramma verminalis is a moth in the family Crambidae. It was described by French entomologist Achille Guenée in 1854. It is found in Sierra Leone.

References

Moths described in 1854
Herpetogramma
Moths of Africa